Ferdinand Tönnies (26 July 1855 – 9 April 1936) was a German sociologist, economist, and philosopher. He was a significant contributor to sociological theory and field studies, best known for distinguishing between two types of social groups, Gemeinschaft and Gesellschaft (community and society). He co-founded the German Society for Sociology together with Max Weber and Georg Simmel and many other founders. He was president of the society from 1909 to 1933, after which he was ousted for having criticized the Nazis. Tönnies was regarded as the first proper German sociologist and published over 900 works, contributing to many areas of sociology and philosophy.  Tönnies, Max Weber, and Georg Simmel are considered the founding fathers of classical German sociology. Though there has been a resurgence of interest in Weber and Simmel, Tönnies has not drawn as much attention.

Biography

Early life 

Ferdinand Tönnies was born on 26 July 1855 on the Haubuarg "De Reap," Oldenswort on the Eiderstedt Peninsula into a wealthy farmer's family in North Frisia, Schleswig, then under Danish rule. Tönnies was the only sociologist of his generation who came from the countryside. He was the third child of church chief and farmer August Ferdinand Tönnies (1822–1883),  and his wife Ida Frederica (born Mau, 1826–1915),  came from a theological family from East Holstein. His father, of Frisian ancestry, was a successful farmer and cattle rancher, while his mother hailed from a line of Lutheran ministers. The two had seven children, four sons and three daughters. On the day he was born, Ferdinand Tönnies received the baptismal name of Ferdinand Julius and moved to Husum, on the North Sea, after his father retired in 1864.

Education and Academic Career 
Tönnies enrolled at the University of Strasbourg after graduating from high school in 1872. They took the time to utilize his freedom to travel, exploring the academic fields of the University of Jena, Bonn, Leipzig, Berlin, and Tübingen. At age 22, he received a doctorate in philology at the University of Tübingen in 1877 (with a Latin thesis on the ancient Siwa Oasis). However, by this time, his main interests had switched to political philosophy and social issues. After completing postdoctoral work at the University of Berlin, he traveled to London to continue his studies on the seventeenth-century English political thinker Thomas Hobbes. Tönnies earned a Privatdozent in philosophy at the University of Kiel from 1909 to 1933 after submitting a draft of his major book, Gemeinschaft und Gesellschaft, as his Habilitationsschrift in 1881. He held this post at the University of Kiel for only three years. Because he sympathized with the Hamburg dockers' strike of 1896, the conservative Prussian government considered him to be a social democrat, and Tönnies would not be called to a professorial chair until 1913. He returned to Kiel as a professor emeritus in 1921 where he took on a teaching position in sociology and taught until 1933 when he was ousted by the Nazis, due to earlier publications in which he had criticized them and had endorsed the Social Democratic Party. Remaining in Kiel, he died three years later in 1936.

Sociological Contributions 
Many of his writings on sociological theories furthered pure sociology, including Gemeinschaft und Gesellschaft (1887). He coined the metaphysical term Voluntarism. Tönnies also contributed to the study of social change, particularly on public opinion, customs and technology, crime, and suicide. He also had a vivid interest in methodology, especially statistics, and sociological research, inventing his own technique of statistical association. After publishing Gemeinschaft and Gesellschaft, Tönnies focused aspects of the social life such as morals, folkways, and public opinion. However he is best known for his published work on Gemeinschaft and Gesellschaft because his later works applied the same concepts to aspects of social life.

Chronological Timeline of his Life and Career 

 1855: Born, 26 July, Oldenswort, in the Duchy of Schleswig
 1864: Dannish annexation of Schleswig, followed by Prusso-Austrian invasion and absorption of Schleswig-Holstein into Prussia. 
 1865: Tönnies family moved to Husum, where his father took up merchant banking.
 1867: Tönnies entered the local grammar school, studied Greek, Latin and German classical literature.
 1870: Franco-Prussian War; creation of German empire. Tönnies met Schleswegian poet and folk-hero, Theodor Storm, who became a life-long influence. 
 1871-7: Studied at the universities of Strasbourg, Jena, Leipzig, Berlin, Kiel and Tübingen. Gained doctorate in Greek philology at Tübingen. Became a close friend of Friedrich Paulsen, an admirer of Kant, Lassalle and Hobbes.
 1878: First visit to England. Worked on Hobbes' manuscripts at the British Museum, Oxford and Hardwick.
 1879–81: Published 'Remarks on the Philosophy of Thomas Hobbes', in Vierteljahrsschrift für wissenschaftliche Philosophie.
 1881: An early version of Gemeinschaft und Gesellschaft submitted as his Habilitationsschrift at university of Kiel.
 1887: First edition of Gemeinschaft und Gesellschaft (sub-titled 'An Essay on Communism and Socialism as Historical Social Systems').
 1889: After prolonged delay, Tönnies's editions of Hobbes' Elements of Law Natural and Politic and Behemoth published in English.
 1890: Failed to obtain a university professorship; became a Privatdozent at Kiel.
 1892: Helped found Society for Ethical Culture, the vehicle for his life-long involvement in various co-operative, social reform and self-improvement movements.
 1893: Offered a university chair, on condition that he gave up Society for Ethical Culture, which he refused. 
 1894: Marriage to Marie Sieck, daughter of a Protestant minister from the Schleswegian town of Eutin. Five children born over the next ten years.
 1896: First edition of Thomas Hobbes. Leben und Lehre. Tönnies' support for Hamburg dock strike compounded his difficulties in gaining a university chair.
 1899–1900: Tönnies' prize essay on 'Philosophical Terminology' published in an English translation by Helen Bosanquet in Mind. 
 1904: Visited America for International Arts and Sciences Congress at St Louis. Contacts with sociologists of the Chicago School. 
 1908: House guest of Max and Marianne Weber during the International Philosophy Congress at Heidelberg.
 1909: First edition of his book on Custom ( Die Sitte ). With Weber and Georg Simmel a founder member of the German Society for Sociology. Tönnies was to be president of this body for most of his life.
 1912: Second editions of Gemeinschaft und Gesellschaft (now subtitled 'Basic Concepts in Pure Sociology') and of Tönnies's study of Hobbes (re-titled Thomas Hobbes. Der Mann und der Denkin)
 1913: His first permanent chair, a professorship of 'economic political science', at the university of Kiel. 
 1917: Publication of Der englische Staat und der deutsche Staat.
 1920: Third edition of Gemeinschaft und Gesellschaft.
 1921: Publication of Marx, Leben und Lehre .
 1922: Publication of Kritik der öffentlichen Meinung.
 1923:  Autobiographical sketch published in Die Philosophie der Gegenwart in Selbstdarstellung . 
 1925: Tönnies's major writings collected in Soziologische Studien und Kritiken. Third edition of Hobbes.
 1931: Publication of Einführung in die Soziologie.
 1932: Joined the Social Democratic party to support resistance to the rise of fascism.
 1933: Adolf Hitler became Chancellor of Germany. Tönnies stripped of his honorary professorship at Kiel, academic pension and personal library by local Nazi administration. 
 1935: A major conference at Leipzig in honour of Tönnies's eightieth birthday. Eighth edition of Gemeinschaft und Gesellschaft. Publication of his final work, Geist der Neuzeit.
 1936: Death of Tönnies.

Gemeinschaft and Gesellschaft

Tönnies distinguished between two types of social groupings. Gemeinschaft—often translated as community (or left untranslated)—refers to groups based on feelings of togetherness and mutual bonds, which are felt like a goal to be kept up, their members being means for this goal. Gesellschaft—often translated as society—on the other hand, refers to groups that are sustained by it being instrumental for their members' aims and goals. The equilibrium in Gemeinschaft is achieved through means of social control, such as morals, conformism, and exclusion, while Gesellschaft keeps its balance through police, laws, tribunals, and prisons. Amish and Hasidic communities are examples of Gemeinschaft, while states are types of Gesellschaft. Rules in Gemeinschaft are implicit, while Gesellschaft has explicit rules (written laws).

Gemeinschaft may be exemplified historically by a family or a neighborhood in a pre-modern (rural) society; Gesellschaft by a joint-stock company or a state in a modern society, i.e. the society when Tönnies lived. Gesellschaft relationships arose in an urban and capitalist setting, characterized by individualism and impersonal monetary connections between people. Social ties were often instrumental and superficial, with self-interest and exploitation increasingly the norm. Examples are corporations, states, or voluntary associations. In his book Einteilung der Soziologie (Classification of Sociology) he distinguished between three disciplines of sociology, being Pure or Theoretical (reine, theoretische) Sociology, Applied (angewandte) Sociology, and Empirical (emprische) Sociology.

His distinction between social groupings is based on the assumption that there are only two primary forms of an actor's will to approve of other men. For Tönnies, such approval is by no means self-evident; he is pretty influenced by Thomas Hobbes. Following his "essential will" ("Wesenwille"), an actor will see himself as a means to serve the goals of social grouping; very often, it is an underlying, subconscious force. Groupings formed around an essential will are called a Gemeinschaft. The other will is the "arbitrary will" ("Kürwille"): An actor sees a social grouping as a means to further his individual goals, so it is purposive and future-oriented. Groupings around the latter are called Gesellschaft. Whereas the membership in a Gemeinschaft is self-fulfilling, a Gesellschaft is instrumental for its members. In pure sociology—theoretically—these two standard types of will are to be strictly separated; in applied sociology—empirically—they are always mixed.

Gender Polarity in "Gemeinschaft und Gesellschaft"

What is less well-known when discussing the work of Tönnies is that he frequently uses gender concepts to explain his main ideas. Essential will-arbitrary will, Gemeinschaft-Gesellschaft, are all thought of in terms of the polarity of feminine-masculine. Gemeinschaft, for example, is feminine: "the eternal-feminine," since motherliness is the basis of all being together. Essential will is also feminine, whereas Gesellschaft and arbitrary choice are masculine. Tönnies' theory appears to consign him to a nineteenth-century view of the public world belonging to males, while women are relegated to the private realm, as it links together Gemeinschaft/home/woman as opposed to Gesellschaft/marketplace/man. 

Views on Family

In his article "Funfzehn Thesen zur Erneuerung eines Familienlebens," published in 1893, he claims that the dissolution of family life has tainted modern society's blood. Tonnies believed that one of the most important ways to resurrect Gemeinschaft in the modern world would be to improve and prolong family life. 

The demise of the family is caused by modern capitalism and its consequences: low pay, excessive hours of labor for men and women alike, and terrible living conditions. He believes family life has to be revitalized since it is the foundation of all culture and morals.  In this case, he proposed two solutions that revolved around the idea of unions devoted to aid and nurture, as he would claim, "the family spirit."

Two Solutions 

 The first would be groupings of organically linked families who, in order to strengthen family life, would preserve family documents, correspond regularly, gather at family festivals, and assist one another by pooling resources. A family fund would be set up to help those who had fallen on hard times or who required money to develop unique skills. 
 The second version would bring together unrelated families and be dedicated to a simpler and healthier way of life, a more serious and reasonable method of social interaction, and a better comprehension of masculine and feminine thought. Three to five families would choose to band together to achieve these goals; eventually, they might live together in a common residence,  engage in cooperative purchasing, and even share products. Groups may eventually band together in order to gain greater economic and moral power.

Criticisms 
Tönnies' distinction between Gemeinschaft and Gesellschaft, like others between tradition and modernity, has been criticized for over-generalizing differences between societies and implying that all societies were following a similar evolutionary path, an argument which Tönnies himself never actually proclaimed.

Published works (selection) 

 1887: Gemeinschaft und Gesellschaft, Leipzig: Fues's Verlag, 2nd ed. 1912, 8th edition, Leipzig: Buske, 1935 (reprint 2005, Darmstadt: Wissenschaftliche Buchgesellschaft; latest edition: Gemeinschaft und Gesellschaft. 1880–1935., hrsg. v. Bettina Clausen und Dieter Haselbach, De Gruyter, Berlin/Boston 2019 = Ferdinand Tönnies Gesamtausgabe, Band 2); his basic and never essentially changed study of social man; translated in 1957 as "Community and Society", 
 1896: Hobbes. Leben und Lehre, Stuttgart: Frommann, 1896, 3rd edn 1925; a philosophical study that reveals his indebtedness to Hobbes, many of whose writings he has edited
 1897: Der Nietzsche-Kultus, Leipzig: Reisland 
 1905: "The Present Problems of Social Structure", in: American Journal of Sociology, 10(5), p. 569–588 (newly edited, with annotations, in: Ferdinand Tönnies Gesamtausgabe, tom. 7, Berlin/New York: Walter de Gruyter 2009, p. 269–285)
 1906: Philosophische Terminologie in psychologischer Ansicht, Leipzig: Thomas
 1907: Die Entwicklung der sozialen Frage, Leipzig: Göschen
 1909: Die Sitte, Frankfurt on Main: Rütten & Loening
 1915:  Warlike England as seen by herself, New York: Dillingham 
 1917: Der englische Staat und der deutsche Staat, Berlin: Curius; pioneering political sociology
 1921: Marx. Leben und Lehre, Jena: Lichtenstein
 1922: Kritik der öffentlichen Meinung, Berlin: Springer; 2nd ed. 2003, Berlin/New York: Walter de Gruyter (Ferdinand Tönnies Gesamtausgabe, tom. 14); translated as On Public Opinion. Applied sociology revealing Tönnies' thorough scholarship and his commitment as an analyst and critic of modern public opinion
 1924, 1926, and 1929: Soziologische Studien und Kritiken, 3 vols, Jena: Fischer, a collection in three volumes of those papers he considered most relevant
 1925, Tönnies, F. Einteilung der Soziologie. Zeitschrift Für Die Gesamte Staatswissenschaft. English translation: Classification of Sociology. Journal of the Complete Political Science/ Institutional and Theoretical Economics, 79(1), 1–15. Retrieved from http://www.jstor.org/stable/40744384 
 1926: Fortschritt und soziale Entwicklung, Karlsruhe: Braun
 1927: Der Selbstmord in Schleswig-Holstein, Breslau: Hirt
 1931: Einführung in die Soziologie, Stuttgart: Enke. His fully elaborated introduction into sociology as a social science (latest edition Ferdinand Tönnies Gesamtausgabe Band 21, herausgegeben von Dieter Haselbach, De Gruyter, Berlin/Boston 2021, ISBN 978-3-11-015853-3).
 1935: Geist der Neuzeit, Leipzig: Buske; 2nd ed. 1998 (in: Ferdinand Tönnies Gesamtausgabe, tom. 22); a study in applied sociology, analysing the transformation from European Middle Ages to modern times
 1971: On Sociology: Pure, Applied, and Empirical. Selected writings edited and with an introd. by Werner J. Cahnman and Rudolf Heberle. The University of Chicago Press. 
 1974: On Social Ideas and Ideologies. Edited, Translated, and Annotated by E. G. Jacoby, Harper & Row 
 1998–: Tönnies' Complete Works (Ferdinand Tönnies Gesamtausgabe), 24 vols., critically edited by Lars Clausen, Alexander Deichsel, Cornelius Bickel, Rolf Fechner (until 2006), Carsten Schlüter-Knauer, and Uwe Carstens (2006– ), Berlin/New York: Walter de Gruyter (1998– )
 Materialien der Ferdinand-Tönnies-Arbeitsstelle am Institut für Technik- und Wissenschaftsforschung der Alpen-Adria-Universität Klagenfurt, edited by Arno Bammé: 
 2008: Soziologische Schriften 1891–1905, ed. Rolf Fechner, Munich/Vienna: Profil
 2009: Schriften und Rezensionen zur Anthropologie, ed. Rolf Fechner, Munich/Vienna: Profil
 2009: Schriften zu Friedrich von Schiller, ed. Rolf Fechner, Munich/Vienna: Profil
 2010: Schriften und Rezensionen zur Religion, ed. Rolf Fechner, Profil, Munich/Vienna: Profil
 2010: Geist der Neuzeit, ed. Rolf Fechner, Profil-Verlag, Munich/Vienna: Profil
 2010: Schriften zur Staatswissenschaft, ed. Rolf Fechner, Profil, Munich/Vienna: Profil
 2011: Schriften zum Hamburger Hafenarbeiterstreik, ed. Rolf Fechner, Munich/Vienna: Profl

See also
Ferdinand-Tönnies-Gesellschaft (Ferdinand Tönnies Society)
Voluntarism (metaphysics)
Hamburg dockers strike 1896/97 [German]
Gemeinschaft and Gesellschaft 
Max Weber

Notes

References
 Adair-Toteff, C., Ferdinand Tönnies: Utopian Visionar, in: Sociological Theory, vol. 13, 1996, p. 58–65
 Bickel, Cornelius: Ferdinand Tönnies: Soziologie als skeptische Aufklärung zwischen Historismus und Rationalismus, Opladen: Westdt. Verlag, 1991.
 Bond, Niall, "Ferdinand Tönnies's Romanticism," The European Legacy, 16.4 (2011), 487–504.
Bond, N. "Ferdinand Tönnies' Appraisal of Karl Marx: Debts and Distance." Journal of Classical Sociology, vol. 13, no. 1, pp. 136–162.
Braeman, John. "Ferdinand Julius Tönnies." Salem Press Biographical Encyclopedia, 2021. 
 Cahnman, Werner J. (ed.), Ferdinand Tönnies: A New Evaluation, Leiden, Brill, 1973.
 Cahnman, Werner J., Weber and Toennies: Comparative Sociology in Historical Perspective. New Brunswick: Transaction, 1995.
 Cahnman, Werner J./Heberle, Rudolf: Ferdinand Toennies on Sociology: Pure, Applied and Empirical, 1971.
 Carstens, Uwe: Ferdinand Tönnies: Friese und Weltbürger, Norderstedt: Books on Demand 2005,  [Biography, German]
 Clausen, Lars: The European Revival of Tönnies, in: Cornelius Bickel/Lars Clausen, Tönnies in Toronto, C.A.U.S.A. 26 (Christian-Albrechts-Universität • Soziologische Arbeitsberichte), Kiel 1998, p. 1–11
 Clausen, Lars: Tönnies, Ferdinand, in: Deutsche Biographische Enzyklopädie, tom. X, Munich: K. G. Saur 2008,  [German]
 Clausen, Lars/Schlüter, Carsten (eds.): Hundert Jahre "Gemeinschaft und Gesellschaft", Opladen: Leske + Budrich 1991 [German]
 Deflem, Mathieu, "Ferdinand Tönnies on Crime and Society: An Unexplored Contribution to Criminological Sociology." History of the Human Sciences 12(3):87–116, 1999
 Deflem, Mathieu,  "Ferdinand Tönnies (1855–1936)." In the Routledge Encyclopedia of Philosophy Online, edited by Edward Craig. London: Routledge, 2001.
 Fechner, Rolf: Ferdinand Tönnies – Werkverzeichnis, Berlin/New York (Walter de Gruyter) 1992,  [Bibliography, German]
 Fechner, Rolf: Ferdinand Tönnies (1855–1936), in: Handbuch der Politischen Philosophie und Sozialphilosophie, Berlin/New York: Walter de Gruyter 2008, 
 Ionin, Leonid: "Ferdinand Tönnies' Sociological Conception", translated by H. Campbell Creighton, in: Igor Kon (ed.), A History of Classical Sociology (pp. 173–188). Moscow: Progress Publishers, 1989.
 Jacoby, Eduard Georg: Die moderne Gesellschaft im sozialwissenschaftlichen Denken von Ferdinand Tönnies, Stuttgart: Enke 1971 [German]
 Merz-Benz, Peter-Ulrich: Tiefsinn und Scharfsinn: Ferdinand Tönnies' begriffliche Konstitution der Sozialwelt, Frankfurt on Main 1995 (same year: Amalfi Prize) [German]
 Podoksik, Efraim: Overcoming the Conservative Disposition: Oakeshott vs. Tönnies. Political Studies 56(4):857–880, 2008.
Stafford, William. "Ferdinand Tonnies on Gender, Women and the Family." History of Political Thought, vol. 16, no. 3, Sept. 1995, p. 391.
Tönnies, Ferdinand. Tönnies: Community and Civil Society : Community and Civil Society, edited by Jose Harris, Cambridge University Press, 2001. 
External links

 

Ferdinand-Tönnies-Gesellschaft
 
Famous Scholars from Kiel: Ferdinand Tönnies

1855 births
1936 deaths
19th-century anthropologists
19th-century German economists
19th-century essayists
19th-century German male writers
19th-century German philosophers
20th-century anthropologists
20th-century German economists
20th-century essayists
20th-century German male writers
20th-century German non-fiction writers
20th-century German philosophers
Continental philosophers
Epistemologists
German anthropologists
German anti-fascists
German ethicists
German Frisians
German male essayists
German male non-fiction writers
German resistance to Nazism
German social democrats
German sociologists
Hobbes scholars
Humboldt University of Berlin alumni
Lecturers
Leipzig University alumni
Metaphysicians
Metaphysics writers
National-Social Association politicians
Nietzsche scholars
North Frisians
Ontologists
People from Nordfriesland
People from the Duchy of Schleswig
Philosophers of culture
Philosophers of economics
Philosophers of education
Philosophers of history
Philosophers of psychology
Philosophers of science
Philosophers of social science
Philosophers of war
Philosophy academics
Philosophy writers
Political philosophers
Scholars of Marxism
German social commentators
Social Democratic Party of Germany politicians
Social philosophers
Theorists on Western civilization
University of Bonn alumni
University of Jena alumni
Academic staff of the University of Kiel
University of Tübingen alumni
Urban theorists
Writers about activism and social change
Writers about globalization